The Toast Rack, or formerly known as the Hollings Building, is a Modernist building in Fallowfield, Manchester, England. The building was completed in 1960 as the Domestic Trades College, became part of Manchester Polytechnic then Manchester Metropolitan University until closure of the "Hollings Campus" in 2013. It was designed by the city architect, Leonard Cecil Howitt and is known as the Toast Rack due to its distinctive form, which reflects its use as a catering college.

The architecture critic Nikolaus Pevsner described the building as "a perfect piece of pop architecture". It was Grade II listed in April 1998 by English Heritage who describe the structure as, "a distinctive and memorable building which demonstrates this architect's love of structural gymnastics in a dramatic way". To others the building symbolises the ideals of the Festival of Britain and architectural positivity following the Second World War.

The building's structure consists of a concrete frame with a brick infill on the bottom half of each storey. The building is seven storeys high and its hyperbolic paraboloid frame continues on the exterior, hence the toast rack comparison. Although the building's unorthodox form is playful, its tapering shape also helps to divide space into varying sizes for larger and smaller classes. A semi-circular restaurant block is attached to the west and is informally known as the "Poached Egg".

Manchester Metropolitan University left their Hollings campus in 2013 as they consolidated their facilities towards the city centre. The building was then put up for sale, being bought by developers for £4,000,000 in 2014. There are plans to redevelop the building with flats, a leisure centre and a rooftop garden.

See also

Listed buildings in Manchester-M14

References

 

Manchester Metropolitan University
Modernist architecture in England
Buildings and structures completed in 1960